Howard Paul "Lefty" Gorman (May 14, 1913 – April 29, 1984) was a professional baseball player.  He was an outfielder over parts of two seasons (1937–1938) with the Philadelphia Phillies.  For his career, he compiled a .200 batting average in 20 at-bats, with one run batted in.

He was born in Pittsburgh, Pennsylvania and later died in Harrisburg, Pennsylvania at the age of 70.

External links

1913 births
1984 deaths
Philadelphia Phillies players
Major League Baseball outfielders
Baseball players from Pittsburgh
Washington Generals (baseball) players
Knoxville Smokies players
Montgomery Rebels players
Andalusia Bulldogs players